The Oleniy Ruchey mine is a large mine located in the Perm Krai. Oleniy Ruchey represents one of the largest phosphates reserve in Russia having estimated reserves of 403.5 million tonnes of ore grading 15.8% P2O5.

As of 2014, the developer of the mine is North-Western Phosphorus Company (NWPC), part of Acron Group.

See also 
 List of mines in Russia

References 

Phosphate mines in Russia